"Help Me" is Episode 22, the season finale of the sixth season of the American medical drama House. It first aired on May 17, 2010. The episode covers a crane collapse in which House tries to save one of the victims, Hanna, who is trapped in rubble. "Help Me" was positively received by critics.

Plot
House (Hugh Laurie),  gives Cuddy a book written by her great-grandfather as a housewarming present. He then arrives at a downtown building, where a crane collapsed and caused an accident that injured numerous people. House, Cuddy, and House's team roam the area diagnosing and treating victims, until they come across the crane operator, who ostensibly fell asleep despite being overloaded with caffeine. House deduces the operator must have passed out and sends him to Princeton-Plainsboro to be diagnosed. He attempts to go with him, but is held back by Cuddy.

While taking a break, House hears a sound similar to that of a person banging on a steel pipe. He informs the emergency officials, who attempt to communicate with anyone possibly trapped beneath the rubble, but they give up after receiving no response. House decides to go looking himself, and crawls under the mountain of rubble until he reaches a deep cavity and finds a trapped woman named Hanna (China Shavers).

As House treats Hanna while waiting for reinforcements, he also begins the differential on the crane operator through the phone and speaks with Cuddy, who reveals that she has gotten engaged to Lucas. House suggests that the crane operator has a brain lesion and orders an MRI. The situation is exacerbated when the emergency official realizes the support beam pinning Hanna, the trapped woman, is also under a mountain of rubble that could collapse. The equipment that can free her is hours away from arriving, so the official suggests amputation. Both Hanna and House refuse.

The crane operator begins bleeding from the eyes during the MRI and House attempts to return to Princeton-Plainsboro to diagnose him, but without his presence Hanna suffers a panic attack. Too much time has now passed and Hanna is at severe risk for crush syndrome.

House then gets into an argument with Cuddy. Cuddy claims House is only refusing amputation to oppose her, bitter over her engagement with Lucas, at which point House calls her a pathetic narcissist. Cuddy then tells House to move on with his life, and insults House further by telling him that she and Wilson are moving on with their own lives and the only one left behind is House, who has nothing.

Hanna refuses the amputation, listening to House's earlier advice, but House soon arrives. To Cuddy's surprise, House tells Hanna she should amputate. He then answers her earlier question of what had happened to his own leg, by telling the story of his infarction and his own refusal of the suggested amputation.

House brings the electric saw and a scalpel to the scene, and explains that he cannot give her anesthesia, since it is too risky, forcing him to amputate the leg with her awake, followed by her screams. She is immediately taken to an ambulance, which then departs for Princeton-Plainsboro. On the ride back, House continues the differential on the crane operator through the phone and deduces that he has a spinal cyst. Hanna suddenly has trouble breathing. House realizes she has a fat embolism, caused by the amputation. Impossible to treat, she dies before arriving at Princeton-Plainsboro.

At the hospital, House encounters Foreman, who tries to lend support about what happened with Hanna. He doesn't accept the offer and leaves the hospital. While Thirteen leaves a leave request letter in front of Taub, House arrives home.

In pain from his leg, various wounds, Hanna's death, and Cuddy's earlier comment, he rips his bathroom mirror out of the wall revealing a hidden cavity behind it, where he had a final stash of Vicodin. Collapsing, he opens a bottle and takes out two pills, thinking that Vicodin is his only way of feeling better. As he is getting ready to take them, Cuddy arrives. She reveals that she ended the relationship with Lucas, because she realized that she truly loves House. Despite having a new fiancé, all she can think about is House, and couldn't live in peace without knowing if they could ever work as a couple. House stands up and walks over to Cuddy and then they share in a tender kiss. House stops and asks if he is hallucinating this and she asks if he took the Vicodin. Realizing it was still in his hand, House drops the pills on the floor. They both smile at each other, sharing another kiss and joining hands.

Production

Filming
This episode was shot entirely using Canon EOS 5D Mark II cameras.
These digital SLR cameras are primarily designed for still-picture photographs, but are one of the first to include high-definition video recording capability. These allowed the production team to work in very tight spaces, using minimal lighting, while also offering a very shallow depth of field putting the backgrounds out of focus, and making the work very challenging for the focus pullers. Original plans only included some scenes to be shot digitally, but eventually the Canon 5D cameras were used for the entire episode.
After successfully using the cameras for scenes on the episode "Lockdown" director of photography Gale Tattersall convinced producers to film an entire episode using the cameras. The episode was filmed using a wide variety of lenses, on loan from Canon. Motion stabilization rigs were also used to make the cameras more like motion picture cameras.

Reception

Ratings and viewership
The episode was watched by 11.06 million American viewers, the 17th highest watched program of the week. Between the 18–49 category, the show received 5.6 million viewers and was the 9th most watched program within the 18–49 viewers. The program, broadcast by Global Total, was watched by 2.55 million Canadians, making it the 4th highest watched program of the week in Canada.

Critical response  
The critical response to the episode was highly positive.

Jonah Krakow of IGN gave the episode an "Incredible" rating of 9.5 out of 10, calling it "fantastic". Jonah Krakow praised the episode's pacing by saying: "This episode didn't let up for one minute, because even while House was trying to save Hannah under threat of the building shifting and crushing him, he had to deal with his personal feelings for Cuddy (who had just gotten engaged to Lucas) while also trying to diagnose the crane operator (at the hospital with his team) via cellphone. In a way, this episode reminded me of one of my favorites from this season, "5 to 9", where Cuddy's jam-packed day at the hospital was spotlighted. Like that episode, just when you thought House and his team were in the clear, there was another speed bump in the road. For example, that amputation was as riveting and horrifying a scene as I can remember... and there were still 20 minutes and plenty of brutal twists and turns left in the episode.

Unrealityshout.com praised the episode and said that: "...it must be said, Hugh Laurie acts his socks off in this episode. I think this is one of the few times another human being has seen House at his most vulnerable. He develops an attachment to Hannah, and I think a lot hinges on his ability to save her. In a series where House has virtually phoned in his diagnoses, here he is with his sleeves rolled up amputating a woman's leg. And still he can't save her. And Hugh Laurie had sheer desperation in his eyes throughout those scenes which actually connected with me as a viewer."

Zack Handlen of The A.V. Club gave the episode a B rating. Handlen wrote: "Help Me" is strong, no question. I cared about the Patient Of The Week for the first time in a very long while (I'm talking about Hanna, not the crane operator, who was only there to give Coke Zero something to do), and while it was easy to predict at the outset she wasn't going to make it, I was still upset when she died. Partly that's because, once she was rescued from under the building, I assumed she was going to be okay—it's an obvious fake out, but an effective one. Plus, as familiar as so much of this was (how many medical dramas have had an episode with a patient trapped under rubble?), it was done well, and Hugh Laurie was so strong, that it really made Hanna's fate matter."

TVFantatic.com gave the episode a 4.6/5.0 and said that "...after Cuddy's cutting diatribe on "Help Me" ("You're gonna risk her life just to save her leg? Really worked out well for you, didn't it?"), House finally realised... he's miserable and alone, no matter how he tries to analyze it... this vulnerability didn't just guarantee Hugh Laurie an Emmy, it made Cuddy fans around the globe celebrate."

Screenrant.com reviewed the episode very positively saying: "Tonight's season finale of House however, was not only beautiful masterpiece in both acting and writing, but also a refreshing return to basics. It included so many jaw-dropping, heart stopping moments that this episode could easily be considered one of the best episodes of House to date because it not only gave fans what they've always wanted (House and Cuddy – together), but it also provides an amazing platform to start off the seventh season."

References

External links 

 "Help Me" at Fox.com
 

House (season 6) episodes
2010 American television episodes